The I CELAC summit or 2013 CELAC summit was the first ordinary heads of state summit of the Community of Latin American and Caribbean States. It was held on 27 and 28 January 2013 in Santiago, Chile.

All CELAC member states participated except Paraguay. Following the impeachment of Fernando Lugo in 2012, Paraguay was excluded from Mercosur and Unasur meetings. While Paraguay was not officially sanctioned or suspended by CELAC, the government decided not to attend the summit, claiming that it had not been invited to it.

On 28 January 2013, the President of Cuba Raúl Castro succeeded President of Chile Sebastián Piñera as the pro tempore president of the CELAC. This was criticized Cuban exile organizations Cuban American National Foundation, Cuban Democratic Directorate, Assembly of the Resistance, Cuban Liberty Council, as well as the Politically Persecuted Venezuelans Abroad (Veppex).

I EU-CELAC summit 
On 26 January 2013, before the I CELAC summit, the I EU-CELAC summit was held. It was the 7th bi-regional summit and the first to have the CELAC as the European Union counterpart in Latin America and the Caribbean.

References

External links 
 Official declaration (Spanish)
 Official website of the I EU-CELAC summit 

2013 conferences
2013 in international relations
2013 in South America
2013 in the Caribbean
Diplomatic conferences in Chile
Summit,2013
January 2013 events in South America